Nataša Pirc Musar (born May 9, 1968) is a Slovenian attorney and author, serving as President of Slovenia since December 23, 2022. She is the former Information commissioner (2004–2014), journalist and former president of the Slovenian Red Cross (2015–2016).

Pirc Musar is best known for her rulings and books on freedom of information, legal opinion, and high-profile legal cases, in which she represented Slovenia-born Melania Trump (wife of former U.S. president Donald Trump), the Social Democrats political party of Slovenia, and other notable clients. In the second round of the presidential elections in November 2022, she was elected the first female president of Slovenia.

Early life and education

Pirc Musar studied law at the University of Ljubljana Faculty of Law in 1992, where Marko Ilešič was her supervisor. In 1997, she passed the bar exam, and later she got a job at Television Slovenia, where she worked for six years as a journalist and host of the central news program. Then, for five years, she was the presenter of the central news program 24UR on commercial television POP TV. In 2001, she became the head of the corporate communication department at Aktiva Group, where her husband Aleš Musar worked.

Pirc Musar completed additional training at CNN in Atlanta. She then continued her studies for two semesters at the University of Salford in England, during which she did internships at the BBC, Granada TV, Sky News, Reuters TV and Border TV. In 2015 she obtained a PhD at the University of Vienna Faculty of Law with a dissertation on a fair balance between privacy rights and the freedom of information.

Legal and business career

In April 2003, Pirc Musar joined the Supreme Court of Slovenia as director of the Center for Education and Information. Pirc Musar is best remembered for being the Commissioner for Access to Public Information between 2004 and 2014. From March 2011, she was the vice-president of the Joint Supervisory Body for Europol, and from 2012 until the end of her mandate as information commissioner, she was the president of this body of the European Union. After the end of her mandate as information commissioner, she founded her own law firm. Rosana Lemut Strle, became a partner in the law firm in 2016, and the Law Firm is now called Pirc Musar & Lemut Strle. Among others she represented Melania Trump, during her husband's US presidency. In highly publicized cases she represented politicians of the Social Democrats, the ambassador to the United States Stanislav Vidovič, among others.

Between 2010 and 2021, Pirc Musar was voted among the top ten most influential lawyers in the country numerous times. She co-founded the OnaVe association to connect female experts and promote knowledge. From 2015 to 2016, she was the president of the Slovenian Red Cross.

Pirc Musar authored or co-authored at least six books on freedom of information and privacy in Slovenian, English, and Croatian.

Political career
On June 23, 2022, Pirc Musar announced her candidacy for President of Slovenia in the 2022 Slovenian presidential election, scheduled for October 23, 2022, as an independent candidate. She was the first to announce her candidacy for president, and she was endorsed by former presidents of Slovenia Milan Kučan and Danilo Türk. Pirc Musar has not been a member of a political party, and she does not plan to become one. While she defended her candidacy as an independent, parties such as the Pirate Party and Youth Party – European Greens also supported her. 

Her candidacy sparked media speculation about her relationship with Marta Kos, vice president of the ruling party Freedom Movement, who announced her own candidacy for president a little later. Pirc Musar and Kos claimed to be friends, but according to media reports they stopped communicating with each other. In September 2022, Kos withdrew her candidacy, which led to a surge in support for Pirc Musar, who was already leading. In October, she came second in the first round of the presidential elections, therefore becoming one of the two contenders in the run-off of the presidential elections in November 2022. In the second round of November 13, Pirc Musar defeated Slovenian Democratic Party candidate Anže Logar and was elected Slovenia's first female president.

Personal life

Pirc Musar is married to the businessman Aleš Musar. They have a son. They are the owners of a property known as the "Russian dacha" in Zgornje Gameljne, and they also own a Rolls-Royce Phantom VI limousine, made in 1971 for and once owned by Princess Alexandra, first cousin of Queen Elizabeth II.

References

External links

Official website

1968 births
Living people
Politicians from Ljubljana
Presidents of Slovenia
University of Ljubljana alumni
University of Vienna alumni
21st-century Slovenian politicians
21st-century Slovenian women politicians
21st-century Slovenian lawyers
Female heads of state
Women presidents